Caluromyinae is a subfamily of opossums. It includes the extant genera Caluromys and Caluromysiops, as well as the extinct Pachybiotherium. Until recently, the genus Glironia was also included. It has sometimes been classed as a full family, Caluromyidae.

Classification

Classification based on Voss and Jansa (2009)

 Subfamily Caluromyinae
 Genus Caluromys
 Subgenus Caluromys
 Bare-tailed woolly opossum (Caluromys philander)
 Subgenus Mallodelphys
 Derby's woolly opossum (Caluromys derbianus)
 Brown-eared woolly opossum (Caluromys lanatus)
 Genus Caluromysiops
 Black-shouldered opossum (Caluromysiops irrupta)
Genus †Pachybiotherium
†Pachybiotherium acclinum

References

Opossums